The  was a field gun used by the Imperial Japanese Army during the Second Sino-Japanese War, Soviet-Japanese Border Wars and World War II. The Type 90 designation was given to this gun as it was accepted in the year 2590 of the Japanese calendar (1930). It was intended to replace the Type 38 75 mm field gun in front line combat units, but due to operational and budgetary constraints, the Type 38 continued to be used.

History and development
Prior to World War I, the Imperial Japanese Army was largely equipped with Krupp cannons from Germany. After the Versailles Treaty, the Japanese switched to the French Schneider company, and purchased numerous examples for test and evaluation. With an army rearmament program starting in 1931, a new 75 mm field gun loosely based on the French Schneider et Cie Canon de 85 mle 1927 built for Greece was introduced, and labeled the "Type 90".

However, few units were built, and the design never achieved its intended purpose of replacing the Type 38 75 mm field gun. The Schneider design was very complex and expensive to build, requiring very tight dimensional tolerances that were beyond the limits of Japanese industry at the time. In particular, the recoil system required a high amount of complex maintenance, which was difficult to sustain in front line combat service.

Design
The Type 90 75 mm field gun was unique among Japanese artillery pieces in that it had a muzzle brake. The carriage was of the split trail type. The Type 90 was built in two version: one with wooden wheels suitable for animal (horse) draft, and another with solid rubber tires and a stronger suspension for towing by motor vehicles. The latter variant was designated as the Motorized Type 90 75 mm field gun (機動九〇式野砲, Kidō Kyūmaru-shiki yahō) and weighed  more.

The Type 90 75 mm field gun was capable of firing high-explosive, armor-piercing, shrapnel, incendiary, smoke and illumination shells.

Combat record
The Type 90 75 mm field gun was issued primarily to units based in Manchukuo, and was rarely deployed to the Pacific theatre of operations. Its initial use in combat was against the Soviet Red Army at the Battle of Nomonhan. When deployed later against Allied forces, it was often used as an anti-tank gun, as its high speed shells were effective against armored vehicles. It was also used at the Battle of the Philippines, Battle of Iwo Jima and Battle of Okinawa, often deployed together with armored units. The Type 90 continued to be used as field artillery until the surrender of Japan.

Variants
The Type 90 formed the basis for the Type 3 75 mm tank gun used in the Type 3 Ho-Ni III Gun tank and Type 3 Chi-Nu medium tank.

References

Notes

Bibliography
 Bishop, Chris (eds). The Encyclopedia of Weapons of World War II, Barnes & Nobel, 1998, 
 McLean, Donald B. Japanese Artillery: Weapons and Tactics, Wickenburg, Ariz. Normount Technical Publications, 1973, 
 Mayer, S. L. The Rise and Fall of Imperial Japan, The Military Press, 1984, 

 US Department of War Special Series No 25  Japanese Field Artillery October 1944
 US Department of War. TM 30-480, Handbook on Japanese Military Forces, Louisiana State University Press, 1994,

Further reading
 Chamberlain, Peter and Gander, Terry. Light and Medium Field Artillery. Macdonald and Jane's, 1975, 
 Chant, Chris. Artillery of World War II, Zenith Press, 2001,

External links
 Type 90 on Taki's Imperial Japanese Army page

World War II field artillery
9
75 mm artillery
Schneider Electric
Military equipment introduced in the 1930s